The 1996 North Atlantic Conference baseball tournament was held at Mahaney Diamond in Orono, Maine.  The top six regular season finishers of the league's nine teams qualified for the double-elimination tournament.  In the championship game, first-seeded Delaware defeated third-seeded Drexel, 12–2, to win its second tournament championship.  As a result, Delaware received the North Atlantic's automatic bid to the 1996 NCAA Tournament.

Seeding
The top six finishers from the regular season were seeded one through six based on conference winning percentage only.  They then played in a double-elimination format.  In the first round, the one and six seeds were matched up in the first game, the two and five seeds in the second, and the three and four seeds in the third.

All-Tournament Team
The following players were named to the All-Tournament Team.

Most Outstanding Player
Delaware pitcher Adam Lamanteer was named Most Outstanding Player.

Notes 

 Delaware sets a tournament record for most runs (27).

References

America East Conference Baseball Tournament
1996 North Atlantic Conference baseball season
Baseball competitions in Maine
1996 in sports in Maine
Sports in Orono, Maine
College sports tournaments in Maine